Dawn of Magic 2, known in North America as Time of Shadows, is an action role-playing game for Microsoft Windows published by 1C Publishing. Released Friday, September 11, 2009, it is the sequel to the 2007 game Dawn of Magic. It was developed by SkyFallen Entertainment.

Dawn of Magic 2 is set 10 years after its predecessor and is reported to include more than 100 spells, comprehensive role-playing, and a balanced wizardry system.

Reception
GirlGamersUK.com gave the game a score of 5/10.

References

2009 video games
1C Company games
Role-playing video games
Action role-playing video games
Video games developed in Russia
Windows-only games
Windows games
Single-player video games